Michael Clark (born May 26, 1961), is a former driver in the NASCAR Craftsman Truck Series from Danville, Indiana. Clark raced in the 1998 and 2000 seasons. His best career finish was 21st. He also failed to qualify for three races. He also raced in F3000, other open wheel, and many late model races. Since leaving NASCAR he has raced stock cars part-time.

References

1961 births
NASCAR drivers
Racing drivers from Indiana
Living people